The Liberal Democrat Party MPs currently have three MPs representing a United Kingdom constituency in London.

Members of Parliament

See also 
 List of parliamentary constituencies in London
 List of Conservative Party Members of Parliament in London
 List of Labour Party Members of Parliament in London

External links 
 London Liberal Democrats

London
Liberal